Darian King was the defending champion but chose not to defend his title.

Federico Delbonis won the title after defeating Guilherme Clezar 7–6(12–10), 7–5 in the final.

Seeds

Draw

Finals

Top half

Bottom half

References
Main Draw
Qualifying Draw

Milo Open Cali - Singles
2017 Singles